Shaker Al-Shujaa Al-Alyan is a Saudi football goalkeeper who played for Saudi Arabia in the 1992 Asian Cup. He also played for Al-Nassr.

References

External links

1972 births
1992 King Fahd Cup players
1992 AFC Asian Cup players
Al-Shabab FC (Riyadh) players
Living people
Saudi Arabian footballers
Saudi Arabia international footballers
Place of birth missing (living people)
Association football goalkeepers